Winfield Hill is the Director of the Electronics Engineering Laboratory at the Rowland Institute at Harvard University. A self-proclaimed "electronics circuit-design guru" and trained physicist and electronic engineer, he co-authored the popular text The Art of Electronics with Harvard Physicist Paul Horowitz.

Engineering work by Hill in the late 1970s at Harvard led him to found the Sea Data Corporation, which designed instruments for deep-sea oceanography.

References
  Winfield Hill's Electronics/Engineering Home Page

External links
Winfield Hill, The Rowland Institute at Harvard

21st-century American engineers
Harvard University faculty
Living people
Year of birth missing (living people)
Place of birth missing (living people)